Tamisha Janelle Williams (born 29 November 1982) is a Barbadian badminton player.

Achievements

BWF International Challenge/Series 
Women's singles

Women's doubles

Mixed doubles

  BWF International Challenge tournament
  BWF International Series tournament
  BWF Future Series tournament

References

External links 
 

Living people
1982 births
Barbadian female badminton players
Badminton players at the 2019 Pan American Games
Pan American Games competitors for Barbados
Competitors at the 2010 Central American and Caribbean Games
Competitors at the 2014 Central American and Caribbean Games
Competitors at the 2018 Central American and Caribbean Games
Badminton players at the 2022 Commonwealth Games
Commonwealth Games competitors for Barbados